The German torpedo boat T3 was one of a dozen Type 35 torpedo boats built for the Kriegsmarine (German Navy) during the late 1930s. Completed in 1940, she was assigned to escort minelayers as they laid their minefields in the North Sea and English Channel in July. The boat was sunk in France by British bombers in September and was refloated the following year. T3 was assigned to the Torpedo School when her repairs were completed in 1943. She returned to active duty a year later and escorted German ships as they bombarded Soviet positions. The boat sank a Soviet submarine in early 1944 and she struck a mine in March 1945 and sank with heavy loss of life.

Design and description
The Type 35 was an unsuccessful attempt by the Kriegsmarine to design a fast, ocean-going torpedo boat that did not exceed the  displacement limit of the London Naval Treaty for ships that counted against the national tonnage limit. Their crew numbered 119 officers and sailors.

As built, the Type 35 class mounted a single  SK C/32 gun on the stern. Anti-aircraft defense was provided by a single  SK C/30 anti-aircraft gun superfiring over the 10.5 cm gun and a pair of  C/30 guns on the bridge wings. They carried six above-water  torpedo tubes in two triple mounts and could also carry 30 mines (or 60 if the weather was good). Many boats exchanged the 3.7 cm gun for another 2 cm gun, depth charges and minesweeping paravanes before completion. Late-war additions were limited to the installation of radar, radar detectors and additional AA guns, usually at the expense of the aft torpedo tube mount.

Construction and career
T3 was ordered on 16 November 1935 from Schichau, laid down at their  Elbing, East Prussia, shipyard on 3 January 1937 as yard number 1382, launched on 23 June 1938 and commissioned on 3 February 1940. The boat was working up until July when she was transferred to the North Sea for convoy escort duties. The following month, T3, T2 and Kondor were transferred to the 1st Torpedo Boat Flotilla with the torpedo boat . On 6–7 September they escorted a minelaying mission in the English Channel. After an attack by British aircraft on Le Havre, France, on the evening of 18 September, T3 capsized with the loss of nine crewmen after being hit by a bomb. She was refloated in 1941 and towed to Germany for repairs.

The boat was recommissioned on 12 December 1943 at Danzig and was assigned to the Torpedo School as a training ship. With refugees aboard T3, some 300 people died when she sank.

Notes

References

External links
Type 35 on German Navy.de

Type 35 torpedo boats
1938 ships